The first season of the ABC American television drama series Scandal premiered on April 5, 2012 and concluded on May 17, 2012, with a total of 7 episodes.

Plot 
This season introduces Olivia Pope and the various members of her firm, as well as President of the United States Fitzgerald Grant (Tony Goldwyn) and Cyrus Beene (Jeff Perry), his chief of staff. The season focused on the lives of the team members, the relationship between Olivia and the president (her former employer), and the mystery surrounding Amanda Tanner's (Liza Weil) involvement with the White House, among other cases the team solved.

Cast and characters

Main

 Kerry Washington as Olivia Pope 
 Henry Ian Cusick as Stephen Finch 
 Columbus Short as Harrison Wright
 Darby Stanchfield as Abigail "Abby" Whelan 
 Katie Lowes as Quinn Perkins 
 Guillermo Diaz as Huck 
 Jeff Perry as White House Chief of Staff Cyrus Beene
 Tony Goldwyn as President Fitzgerald "Fitz" Thomas Grant III

Recurring
 Joshua Malina as David Rosen
 Bellamy Young as First Lady Melody "Mellie" Grant
 Brendan Hines as Gideon Wallace 
 Matt Letscher as Billy Chambers 
 Liza Weil as Amanda Tanner 
 Dan Bucatinsky as James Novak 
 Kate Burton as Vice President Sally Langston 
 Brian Letscher as Tom Larsen 
 George Newbern as Charlie

Guest stars
 Mimi Kennedy as Sharon Marquette
 JoBeth Williams as Sandra Harding
 Valerie Cruz as Carolina Flores
 Brenda Song as Alissa
 Samantha Sloyan as Jeannine Locke
 Wes Brown as Lieutenant Sully St. James

Episodes

Reception
The series got generally favorable reviews from critics, with many being intrigued by the mysteries on the show and praised the show for having an African-American lead role. The series started with generally positive reviews from critics. The review aggregator website Rotten Tomatoes reports an 89% approval rating with an average rating of 6.59/10 based on 28 reviews. The website's consensus reads, "Scandal is a soapy show about work and love that's over the top but never boring." Metacritic gave the show a rating of 64 out of 100 based on 29 reviews.

Ratings

Live + SD ratings

Live + 7 Day (DVR) ratings

Awards and nominations

DVD release

References

External links

2012 American television seasons
Season 1